Jalqamus  is a Palestinian village in the West Bank, located 10 km southeast of the city of Jenin in the northern West Bank. According to the Palestinian Central Bureau of Statistics, the town had a population of  1,867 inhabitants in mid-year 2006.

History 
Ceramics from the Byzantine era have been found here.

Ottoman  era
In 1838, during the Ottoman era,  Jelkamus was noted as a village in the Haritheh area, north of Nablus.

In 1870, Jalqamus, called Djell Kamous, situated south of   Deir Abu Da'if,  was one of the villages  Victor Guérin noted from Faqqua. 

In 1882, the PEF's Survey of Western Palestine described Jelkamus as "a small village on a hill-top, surrounded by plough-land, with a few olives, built of stone and  mud, with rain-water cisterns."

British Mandate  era
In the 1922 census of Palestine, conducted  by the British Mandate authorities, Jalqamus had a population of 124 Muslims,   increasing in the 1931 census to 150 Muslims, in a total of 31  houses.

In the 1944/5 statistics  the population of Jalqamus was 220 Muslims, with 4,437 dunams of land, according to an official land and population survey.  Of this, 180 dunams were used  for plantations and irrigable land, 2,422 for cereals, while 6 dunams were built-up (urban) land.

Jordanian era
In the wake of the 1948 Arab–Israeli War, and after the 1949 Armistice Agreements, Jalqamus came under Jordanian rule.

The Jordanian census of 1961 found 435 inhabitants.

Post-1967
Since the Six-Day War in 1967,  Jalqamus  has been under  Israeli occupation. Under the Oslo Accords, the town was assigned to Area A.

During the early months of the First Intifada, 17 May 1989, Omar Yusuf Bayer, aged 42, from Jalqamus, was shot dead while in Jenin. Yitzhak Rabin in a reply to a member of Knesset, August 1989, confirmed early reports that he had been shot by a civilian and therefor the Military Police Investigators were not investigating.

References

Bibliography

External links 
 Welcome To Jalqamus
Jalqamus, Welcome to Palestine
Survey of Western Palestine, Map 9:  IAA, Wikimedia commons 

Villages in the West Bank
Jenin Governorate
Municipalities of the State of Palestine